Tomi Okawa (born 26 February 1932) is a former international table tennis player from Japan.

Career 
From 1953 to 1961 Okawa won five medals in singles, doubles, and team events in the World Table Tennis Championships. The five World Championship medals included three gold medals in the singles at the 1956 World Table Tennis Championships and two in the team event at the 1957 World Table Tennis Championships and 1961 World Table Tennis Championships.  Okawa also won an English Open title.

See also
 List of table tennis players
 List of World Table Tennis Championships medalists

References

Japanese female table tennis players
Asian Games medalists in table tennis
Table tennis players at the 1958 Asian Games
Asian Games gold medalists for Japan
Asian Games bronze medalists for Japan
Medalists at the 1958 Asian Games
1932 births
Living people